Several ships of the Royal Navy have borne the name HMS Watchful:
  was the mercantile brig Jane, which the Navy purchased in 1804 and renamed HMS Watchful. Jane had been launched in 1795 at Norfolk. In 1805, Watchful participated in several actions against French and Dutch vessels on their way to Boulogne. Watchful also participated in the siege of Cadiz in 1810–1811. Between 1811 and 1814 she served as a tender on the Thames. The Navy sold her in 1814.
 , a  wood steam gunboat built in 1856 by T & W Smith, North Shields. Sold at Hong Kong in 1871.
 , an  4-gun composite steam gunboat built by Laird in 1883. Became a boom defence vessel in 1903, then sold in 1907.
 , a coastguard vessel, built by Hall Russell for service in Newfoundland. Sold 1920 to the Newfoundland Government.
 , a fishery protection vessel, previously MFV 1080, renamed 1948.
 , a fishery protection vessel, previously Motor Launch ML 2840.
 , a fishery protection vessel, previously  minehunter . Renamed in 1959

In addition, the Royal Navy used the hired trawler Watchful as boom defence vessel BDV 7, 1915–1919.

References

Royal Navy ship names